Ccotaña is a populated place in Arequipa Region, Peru.

See also
Chivay

References

Populated places in the Arequipa Region